Contador may refer to:

 Contador, an official of the Spanish royal treasury; see Spanish colonization of the Americas

People with the surname
Alberto Contador (born 1982), Spanish cyclist
Javiera Contador (born 1974), Chilean actress

Places
Contador Airport, an airport serving the town of Pitalito in the Huila Department of Colombia
Estadio Contador Damiani, a football stadium in Montevideo, Uruguay
Palacio Contador Gastón Guelfi, an indoor sporting arena that is located in Montevideo, Uruguay